Amen (So Be It) is the debut album by Irish musician Paddy Casey. It was released on 28 June 1999.

Track listing
 “Fear”
 “Whatever Gets You True”
 “Can’t Take That Away”
 “Ancient Sorrow”
 “Everybody Wants”
 “Sweet Suburban Sky”
 “Downtown”
 “Would U B”
 “Winter’s Fire”
 “Rainwater”
 “It’s Over Now”

Charts

References

1999 debut albums
Paddy Casey albums